Hansheinrich Dransmann (1894–1964) was a German composer.

Selected filmography
 Jimmy: The Tale of a Girl and Her Bear (1923)
 Chamber Music (1925)
 Prem Sanyas (1925)
 The Hanseatics (1925)
 The Salesgirl from the Fashion Store (1925)
 Our Daily Bread (1926)
 Give My Regards to the Blonde Child on the Rhine (1926)
 Lord of the Night (1927)
 Excluded from the Public (1927)
 Thieves (1928)
 The Sinner (1928)
 The Story of a Little Parisian (1928)
 When the Mother and the Daughter (1928)
 The Women's War (1928)
 Anastasia, the False Czar's Daughter (1928)
 Under the Lantern (1928)
 A Better Master (1928)
 The Page Boy at the Golden Lion (1928)
 Eva in Silk (1928)
 Lemke's Widow (1928)
 Sir or Madam (1928)
 The Woman Everyone Loves Is You (1929)
 Ludwig II, King of Bavaria (1929)
 The Green Monocle (1929)
 German Wine (1929)
 Children of the Street (1929)
 Bobby, the Petrol Boy (1929)
 The Circus Princess (1929)
 The Three Kings (1929)
 Yes, Yes, Women Are My Weakness (1929)
 Waterloo (1929)
 Daughter of the Regiment (1929)

References

Bibliography

External links

1894 births
1964 deaths
German composers